Philodendron gigas is a species of flowering plant in the family Araceae. It is endemic to Panama, first described in  1997.

References

gigas
House plants
Endemic flora of Panama
Plants described in 1997